Wunderlich syndrome can refer to one of several conditions. One condition called Wunderlich syndrome is spontaneous, nontraumatic kidney bleeding confined to the subcapsular and perirenal space. It may be the first manifestation of a renal angiomyolipoma (AML), or the rupture of a renal artery or intraparenchymal aneurysm. The renal condition should not be confused with other conditions which are Mullerian duct anomalies, such as Herlyn-Werner-Wunderlich syndrome. Some sources refer to double uters-hemivagina-renal agenesis as simply Wunderlich syndrome, but Herlyn-Werner-Wunderlich is a better term to distinguish the two.

Presentation

Cause
Neoplasms are the most common underlying pathology in up to 60% of cases and include renal angiomyolipoma and renal cell carcinoma. Other causes include rupture of renal artery or an arteriovenous malformation, polyarteritis nodosa, cystic medial necrosis, segmental arterial mediolysis, and cystic rupture. Few case series suggested angiomyolipoma as the most common cause.

Diagnosis
First symptoms may be subtle such as mild pain, flank tenderness, hematuria. Depending on blood loss, symptoms of hypovolemic shock may develop. Hematoma is usually contained in the retroperitoneum, allowing for a period of hemodynamic stability. Sometimes massive acute hemorrhage is seen when a hematoma ruptures Gerota's fascia and extends into the peritoneum. An ultrasound or CT scan can establish diagnosis, while lab tests may be inconclusive as changes of hematocrit or hemoglobin are not specific to the syndrome, while hematuria is not always present.

Treatment
Treatment varies according to severity, ranging from monitoring of the hematoma (in hemodynamic stability) to emergency surgery (when patients develop hypovolemic shock requiring seminephrectomy or nephrectomy). Vascular causes lead to surgery due to severity of hemorrhage. Robotic-assisted partial nephrectomy has been proposed as a surgical treatment of a ruptured angiomyolipoma causing retroperitoneal hemorrhage, combining the advantages of a kidney preservation procedure and the benefits of a minimally invasive procedure without compromising the safety of the patient.

References

External links 

Kidney diseases